Richard "Red" Amick (January 19, 1929 – May 16, 1995) was an American racecar driver.

Indy 500 overview
Born in Kansas City, Missouri, Amick died in Crystal River, Florida. He drove in the USAC Championship Car series, racing in the 1958-1960 seasons with five starts, including the 1959 and 1960 Indianapolis 500 races.  He finished in the top ten once, with his best Indy finish in 11th in 1960.

Indy 500 results

Complete Formula One World Championship results
(key)

External links
 

1929 births
1995 deaths
Champ Car drivers
Indianapolis 500 drivers
Racing drivers from Missouri
Racing drivers from Kansas City, Missouri
Sportspeople from Kansas City, Missouri